SM Town Live 2022: SMCU Express at Kwangya (stylized as SMTOWN LIVE 2022: SMCU EXPRESS @ KWANGYA) was an online live concert held on January 1, 2022, by SM Entertainment. Similar to the 2021-new-year online concert SMTOWN Live "Culture Humanity", the concert was broadcast free of charge online through various streaming platforms and selected broadcasting network in selected countries.

Background
On December 10, 2021, SM Entertainment announced that it would be releasing an winter album titled 2021 Winter SM Town: SMCU Express. In the same announcement, it was also announced that a free-to-watch live online concert will also be held on January 1, 2022. The lineup consisting of Kangta, BoA, TVXQ, Super Junior, Taeyeon and Hyoyeon of Girls' Generation, Onew, Key, and Minho of Shinee, Kai of Exo, Red Velvet, NCT U, NCT 127, NCT Dream, WayV, Aespa, Ginjo, Imlay, and Raiden was announced on December 23, 2021. On December 27, 2021, it was announced newly formed supergroup Got the Beat will make their debut at the concert. On December 30, 2021, J.E.B, Minimonster, Mar Vista, and Hitchhiker was added to the performers lineup. In addition, it was announced Changmin would be performing a preview of "Fever" from his upcoming album prior to the actual release. On January 24, Beyond LIVE and U+ Idol Live announced the concert will be re-streamed on January 29, 2022.

Performers

Broadcast

Notes

References

SM Town concert tours
2022 concert tours
Beyond Live